Lindgren is a Swedish surname.

Geographical distribution
As of 2014, 58.0% of all known bearers of the surname Lindgren were residents of Sweden, 26.3% of the United States, 7.0% of Finland, 2.4% of Norway, 1.8% of Denmark and 1.7% of Canada.

In Sweden, the frequency of the surname was higher than national average in the following counties:
 1. Västerbotten (1:108)
 2. Norrbotten (1:197)
 3. Västmanland (1:310)
 4. Västernorrland (1:312)
 5. Gävleborg (1:322)
 6. Jämtland (1:347)
 7. Uppsala (1:352)
 8. Dalarna (1:370)
 9. Gotland (1:370)
 10. Östergötland (1:409)

In Finland, the frequency of the surname was higher than national average in the following regions:
 1. Åland (1:979)
 2. Ostrobothnia (1:1,010)
 3. Southwest Finland (1:1,067)
 4. Uusimaa (1:1,265)
 5. Satakunta (1:1,593)
 6. Southern Savonia (1:1,766)

Notable people
Armada (video game player) (Adam Lindgren, born 1993)
Armas Lindgren, Finnish architect
Astrid Lindgren (1907–2002), Swedish fiction writer, known for the character Pippi Longstocking
3204 Lindgren, an asteroid named in her honour
Barbro Lindgren (born 1937), a Swedish author.
Blaine Lindgren (1939–2019), American sprinter
Charles Magnus Lindgren, Swedish-American ship owner
Charlie Lindgren (born 1993), American professional ice hockey goaltender
David Lindgren (born 1982), Swedish singer, actor, and television presenter
Emil Lindgren, Swedish professional mountain biker
Erick Lindgren, poker professional
Erik Lindgren, American musician and record producer
Erik Lindgren (ice hockey), Swedish ice hockey player
Fredrik Lindgren (musician) (born 1971), Swedish musician
Fredrik Lindgren (ice hockey) (born 1980), Swedish ice hockey player
Fredrik Lindgren (speedway rider) (born 1985), Swedish speedway rider
Fredrik Lindgren (golfer) (born 1966), Swedish golfer
Gerry Lindgren (1946-), American athlete
George Lindgren, Baron Lindgren (1900-1971), British Labour Party politician
Glenn Lindgren, chef, food writer, and frequent television and radio guest host
Göran Lindgren (1927-2012), Swedish film producer
Gottfrid Lindgren, Swedish wrestler
Gustaf Lindgren, Swedish architect
Hans Lindgren (1932-2012), Swedish actor, screenwriter, and film producer
Harry Lindgren (1912-1992), British/Australian engineer, linguist, and amateur mathematician
Hugo Lindgren, American magazine and newspaper editor
Jacob Lindgren, baseball player
James Lindgren, American professor of law
Jesper Lindgren (born 1997), Swedish professional ice hockey defenseman
Joanna Lindgren, Australian politician
Johan Lindgren, Swedish professional road bicycle racer
John Lindgren (1899-1990), Swedish Olympic cross-country skier
John R. Lindgren, American banking executive
Jon Lindgren, Mayor of Fargo, North Dakota and LGBT advocate
Jouko Lindgren (born 1955), Finnish competitive sailor
Justa Lindgren (1878-1951), American football player and coach
Kevin Lindgren, Australian lawyer and judge of the Federal Court of Australia
Kjell N. Lindgren, American astronaut
Lars Lindgren (born 1952), Swedish ice hockey defenseman
Lars Lindgren (curler) (born 1957), Swedish curler
Lars-Magnus Lindgren (1922-2004), Swedish filmmaker
Lennart Lindgren (1915-1952), Swedish sprinter
Lennart Lindgren (Swedish Navy officer) (1919–2013)
Lisa Lindgren (born 1968), Swedish actress
Lisa Lindgren (American actress) (1960-2005)
Léon (Swedish singer) (Lotta Lindgren, born 1993)
Magnus Lindgren (chef) (1982-2012), Swedish chef
Magnus Lindgren (born 1974), Swedish jazz musician
Mattias Lindgren (born 1972), Swedish rower
Michael Lindgren, Swedish actor, producer, and writer
Minna Lindgren, Finnish writer and journalist
Mats Lindgren, Swedish ice hockey player
Niklas Lindgren (born 1972), Swedish serial rapist
Niklas Lindgren (sailor) (born 1988), Finnish sailor
Pär Lindgren, Swedish composer and composition teacher
Peter Lindgren (actor), Swedish actor
Peter Lindgren (musician), Swedish guitarist
Peter Lindgren (tennis), Swedish tennis player
Peter Lindgren (business theorist) (born 1961), Danish organizational theorist
Perttu Lindgren (born 1987), Finnish professional ice hockey center
Rasmus Lindgren, Swedish football player
Robert Lindgren, American lawyer and educator
Ryan Lindgren, American ice hockey player
Sten Lindgren (1903-1959), Swedish film director
Steven O. Lindgren (born 1949), American educator and politician
Sven Lindgren (born 1946), Moderate Party politician and former Governor of Kalmar County, Sweden
Tauno Lindgren, Finnish cyclist
Thure Lindgren (1921-2005), Swedish ski jumper
Tommy Lindgren (born 1977), Finnish singer-songwriter and human rights activist
Torgny Lindgren (1938-2017), Swedish writer
Ulrik Lindgren, Swedish Christian democratic politician
Waldemar Lindgren (1860-1939), Swedish-American geologist

See also 
 Lindegren, surname
 Astrid Lindgren Memorial Award
 Astrid Lindgren's World
 Lindgren Acres, Florida
 Lindgren oxidation
 Lindgren Road

References

Swedish-language surnames